Chelsea Chen (born December 30, 1983 in San Diego) is an internationally renowned young American organist and composer. 

Chen has been successful in establishing a concert career in North America, Europe and Asia.  She has composed several original compositions, and has adapted music ranging from major classical repertoire to video game soundtracks to Taiwanese folk songs for the organ and other instruments.

Education and career
Chen began piano studies at a young age, studying with Jane Smisor Bastien and Lori Bastien Vickers. At age fifteen, she began studying organ, first with Leslie Robb, and later with Monte Maxwell, Chapel Organist for the United States Naval Academy. After only two years of lessons, she was accepted into the Juilliard School, where she studied first with John Weaver and then with Paul Jacobs, completing her undergraduate degree in 2005 and her graduate degree in 2006. In 2006, she was accepted for a Fulbright Fellowship and spent the next year composing and performing in Taiwan, where she played an important role in increasing exposure to the pipe organ in that country. In 2007, she was accepted into the Artist Diploma program at Yale University, where she studied with Thomas Murray. She performs a wide variety of repertoire, and in addition to works from the standard repertory, she has premiered both her own compositions and works of fellow Juilliard composers such as Teddy Niedermaier and Ola Gjeilo.

She has been the recipient of numerous awards. In 2003, she won the Region IX regional convention of the American Guild of Organists. In 2004, she made it to the final round of the Augustana/Reuter National Organ Undergraduate Competition, returning next year to win first place. While at Juilliard, she was awarded the John Erskine Prize for scholastic and artistic distinction.  In 2005, she recorded her first CD and DVD at Heinz Chapel in Pittsburgh. In 2004 and 2006, she was invited to perform at the AGO National Conventions in Los Angeles and Chicago. In addition to her academic studies, she maintains a busy performing career both in the states and abroad.  She has recently performed in San Diego, Dallas, New York, Taiwan, Hong Kong, and Singapore, among other places. Notable upcoming performances include her debut at the Disney Concert Hall in Los Angeles, and a performance of Messiaen's "La Nativite du Seigneur" at Christ Church in New Haven, Connecticut, in celebration of the 100th anniversary of his birth.

Recently, Chen was appointed to the position of Organist and Artist in Residence at Coral Ridge Presbyterian Church in Fort Lauderdale, Florida. In addition to her role as organist, Chen will also oversee a new annual concert series at the church.

Reviews

"Chelsea played with confidence, style, and imagination at a level that many older performers would surely envy. She went on to win the Augustana Arts/Reuter competition in Denver in 2005, and superbly presented a fully memorized program to an American Guild of Organist's Winter Conclave in Las Vegas in January 2006, and appeared again for the AGO in Chicago [at the National Convention] this summer. All of 21 years old, at the time Chelsea was also invited to play at the Heinz chapel of the University of Pittsburgh, during an American Institute of Organbuilders Conference. On that occasion she shared music which she herself had composed--honoring her father and his Chinese ancestry--a Taiwanese Suite based on folk melodies. Both Bach and Reger surely would have approved of the formidable talent of our soloist Chelsea Chen. The [organ's] future is in the hands as players such as Chelsea Chen who not only perform exceptionally well but also compose for the organ and encourage other friends of their generation to write for it too."

"I believe that I spied the figures in the stained glass windows dancing along with Chelsea's music. Ms. Chen is to be congratulated for an excellent recital. She presented herself in a professional, well-informed and humble manner."

"At [organbuilders] conventions I generally listen intently to the instrument, appreciate the efforts of the organist, and pay relatively little attention to the performances. But I was powerless to ignore the playing of Chelsea Chen. It's easy to qualify, to say 'she's great...for one so young!' Playing like that is captivating, regardless of age. It wasn't just that I enjoyed her selections or agreed with her choice of stops. She does not play the organ. She makes the organ her instrument for making music. Her every move is musical. Every piston she pushes, every manual change, every tiny nudge of the shades is a fluid part of her music. I watched her left hand playing the almost inaudible accompaniment in the Bach 'Badinerie'. Every note perfectly attacked and released. Not fussy, just perfect. If Chelsea Chen is a harbinger of the generation on the horizon, there's going to be a lot of organbuilding to do."

Footnotes

External links
Chelsea Chen Website
Chelsea Chen Recordings and Sheet Music

1983 births
Living people
American organists
Women organists
Composers for pipe organ
People from San Diego
21st-century American women musicians
21st-century organists
21st-century American keyboardists